Acadia: A New Orleans Bistro, or simply Acadia, was a Cajun-, Louisiana Creole-, and Southern-style restaurant in northeast Portland, Oregon, in the United States.

Description
Acadia was a Cajun-, Louisiana Creole- and Southern-style restaurant located at 1303 Northeast Fremont Street in Portland's Sabin neighborhood. Its specialities included grilled pork chops and barbecue shrimp; the menu also included catfish, filet mignon, gumbo, jambalaya, and homemade ice cream.

History 
Adam Higgs became owner in 2004. The restaurant closed in 2022, during the COVID-19 pandemic.

Reception 

The eighth edition of Best Places: Portland (2010) rates the restaurant two and a half out of three stars. In Food Lover's Guide to Portland (2014), Liz Crain included Acadia in her list of "go to" seafood restaurants. Willamette Week included the business in a 2016 list of Portland's best seafood establishments.

After recommending the Louisiana barbecue shrimp, andouille, and sanguinaccio in 2016, Michael Russell included Acadia in The Oregonian 2017 overview of the 40 best restaurants in northeast Portland and wrote, "Portland might not be the first place I'd go looking for Cajun/Creole cuisine, but this charming Sabin neighborhood restaurant does have a few arguments in its favor, none more compelling than these beautiful Nola-style barbecue shrimp. Having tried both in the past year, I can definitively say that Acadia's rendition, with its plump shrimp in a decadent white wine, butter and lemon sauce, blows the original at New Orleans' Pascal Manale's completely out of the Gulf waters." He also included Acadia in the newspaper's 2018 list of Portland's 10 best Southern restaurants. Russell ranked the business number 32 and number 34 on 2018 and 2019 lists of the city's best restaurants, respectively.

See also
 COVID-19 pandemic in Portland, Oregon
Impact of the COVID-19 pandemic on the restaurant industry in the United States
List of Cajun restaurants
List of defunct restaurants of the United States
List of Louisiana Creole restaurants
List of seafood restaurants
List of Southern restaurants

References

External links

 
 

2022 disestablishments in Oregon
Creole restaurants in the United States
Defunct Cajun restaurants in the United States
Defunct seafood restaurants in Portland, Oregon
Louisiana Creole restaurants in the United States
Restaurants disestablished during the COVID-19 pandemic
Restaurants disestablished in 2022
Sabin, Portland, Oregon
Southern restaurants